The Humber Refinery is a British oil refinery in South Killingholme, North Lincolnshire. It is situated south of the railway line next to the A160; Total's Lindsey Oil Refinery is north of the railway line.

It is owned by Phillips 66 since the split of ConocoPhillips on 1 May 2012

History
At the time of construction Continental Oil (Conoco) owned the Jet distributor of petrol. Jet was formed in 1953 and was based nearby in Keadby in northern Lincolnshire. In June 1961 Continental Oil bought Jet Petroleum, and its 400 garages. In 1960 Continental had bought the German petrol company Sopi, and its 300 garages.

The refinery was first planned in July 1964, and in August 1964 it was expected to cost £15 million, and to be operational by late 1966.

Construction
Construction started in August 1966. It was built for Continental Oil (UK) Ltd. It was originally estimated to cost £25 million but cost twice that. It was built by Power-Gas Corporation, a subsidiary of Sheffield-based Davy-Ashmore who had a £22 million contract. It should have been built by November 1968, and the delay in completion was blamed on bad weather in the summer of 1968, and the 1968/9 winter. Davy-Ashmore lost £12 million on the project. The railway sidings were installed by the Ward Group of Sheffield. 75 miles of steel tubing were made by the Corby steel works for £250,000. In September 1967 there were gales across the country and a man was killed on the site when an engineering shed fell on him. In October 1967 there was a strike, and 120 workers in the Constructional Engineers Union were sacked. In January 1968 a 20-year-old worker from Dublin was killed when a 275-ton coke drum, being raised by a twin jib rig onto a gantry, fell 50 feet to the ground, causing the worker to be crushed by a crane.

The £330,000 18-mile underground pipeline from Tetney was made by O'Connor and Davies, part of British Steel Constructions. Six coke silos were built by Sir Robert McAlpine in a £200,000 contract. The sub-sea part of the Tetney pipeline was replaced in 2015.

Corporate social responsibility
The Humber Refinery has strong community outreach with recent investments of $500,000 in 2009 to the local school Oasis Academy Immingham to encourage engineering and promote STEM.  In 2014 a donation of £240,000 was given to build an Enterprise Suite at Killingholme School helping students to learn employability skills.  The Refinery was also founder member of BEEP Business Education and Enterprise Partnership that was established in 2011 to strengthen links between business and education offering a range of activities for schools in the Northern Lincolnshire area.

The refinery runs a community liaison group called KAAG (Killingholme Area Advisory Group) they meet monthly and discuss refinery operations and any village concerns.  They also organise events for North & South Killingholme, including the free Senior Citizens Christmas Party, Murder Mystery event and sponsor the village children's Christmas party.

Environmental

The refinery has continually had the lowest emissions of any UK refinery.

In 2005 the refinery dedicated 120 acres of its land to plant a community woodland.  Over 67,500 trees were planted and a competition launched to name it.  A student at Killingholme School won and it was called Mayflower Wood, reinforcing the local areas links with the Pilgrim Fathers.  The woodland is open to the community with permissive rights of way.  The Woodland was opened by Prince Andrew, Duke of York KG GCVO ADC.

Production
At the time of its opening Britain was using around 83,000 tons of petroleum coke a year, most of which was imported, and used in aluminium smelting. Much of the crude oil came from Libya, as Continental Oil had large discoveries there, and also in Dubai.

The refinery had its own fire brigade. This was used on 8 August 1972 when there was a fire, with 50 feet flames, and a 49-year-old man from Grimsby was killed.

At this time, around a third of the oil it processed came from the North Sea. It was the first refinery to receive oil from British National Oil Corporation's (Britoil) Thistle field on 15 April 1978.

In the mid-1990s Conoco invested £500 million in the plant.

Production
Production facilities include an alkylation plant, rotary kilns for  petroleum coke manufacturing. 

Crude oil arrives by tanker at Tetney in East Lindsey, then stored at the Tetney oil terminal, before being pumped underground to the refinery for refining.

 of petrol are produced per day, most of which is loaded onto tanker lorries at Immingham Dock. 70% of production is for the UK market, the remainder is exported.

700,000 tonnes of petroleum coke are produced each year.  A purpose-built warehouse on the docks stores the petroleum coke before it is shipped out.

Process units

 Thermal cracker
 Atmospheric and vacuum distillation
 Two delayed coking units
 Virgin distillate hydrodesulpuriser
 Cracked distillate hydrodeulphuriser
 Heavy gas oil desulphuriser
 Two catalytic reforming units
 Pentane – hexane isomerisation plant
 Aromatics extraction plant
 Toluene dealkylation plant
 Gas recovery plant
 Two sulphur recovery units
 Tail gas treatment unit (Brought online in 2015)
 Fluid catalytic cracker
 Propylene – butylene catalytic polymerisation unit
 Pressure swing absorber for hydrogen recovery
 Cryogenic LPG recovery plant
 Propylene recovery and HF alkylation unit

Power station

Since 1 November 2004, power for the Humber Refinery has  come from the nearby £300 million Combined Heat and Power 734 MWe  Immingham Power Station, owned by ConocoPhillips. This was improved to produce 1,180 MW from summer 2009. Next-door to the north are Killingholme A power station and Killingholme B power station. The Immingham Combined Heat & Power Plant (ICHP) was sold to VPI in 2013.

2001 Incident

In April 2001, a large explosion occurred on the Saturate Gas Plant area of the site. ConocoPhillips was investigated and subsequently fined £895,000 and ordered to pay £218,854 costs by the Health and Safety Executive for failing to effectively monitor the degradation of the refineries' pipework. The company pleaded guilty to these charges in court and has since implemented a Risk Based Inspection programme.

See also

 Theddlethorpe Gas Terminal – owned by ConocoPhillips on the Lincolnshire coast near Mablethorpe

References

External links

 
 

Oil refineries in the United Kingdom
Phillips 66
Buildings and structures in Lincolnshire
Buildings and structures completed in 1969
North Sea energy
Borough of North Lincolnshire